Willi Gantschnigg (1 January 1920 – 2 December 1987) was an Austrian ski jumper and folk musician being a member of Schuhplattler group Edelraute.

Career
He was member of his homeclub SC St. Johann in Tirol. He donated his skis to local history museum Kitzbühel, which was run by his friend Martin Wörgötter.

On 28 February 1950 he set the world record, not clear if 123, 124 or 125 metres (403.6, 407 or 410 ft) at Heini-Klopfer-Skiflugschanze in Oberstdorf, West Germany. Two days later he crashed and seriously injured at the world record distance 130 m (430 ft).

Ski jumping world records

Not recognized! Crashed and broke his leg at world record distance.

Notes

References

External links
Heini Klopfer – vom Skispringen zum Skifliegen verschoenerungsverein-oberstdorf.de

Austrian male ski jumpers
1920 births
1977 deaths
Sportspeople from Tyrol (state)